Lords of EverQuest is a 3D fantasy real-time strategy game released in December 2003.  It was developed by the short-lived startup company Rapid Eye Entertainment and published by Sony Online Entertainment (SOE). SOE distributes Lords of EverQuest.

Unlike the original EverQuest, Lords of EverQuest is fundamentally a single player game, and after the initial payment for the software, does not require a recurring monthly fee in order to play.

Reception

The game received "mixed" reviews according to video game review aggregator Metacritic. IGN reviewer Tom McNamara praised its multiplayer experience, but overall considered the game mediocre and decried it for focusing heavily on uninteresting combat fueled by only a single resource. The developer, Rapid Eye Entertainment, closed down after the release of the game.

References

External links
 

2003 video games
EverQuest
Windows games
Windows-only games
Real-time strategy video games
Video games developed in the United States